Shady Grove is an unincorporated community in Trousdale County, Tennessee, United States. As Hartsville and Trousdale County form a consolidated city-county government, Shady Grove is under the jurisdiction of Hartsville.

References

Unincorporated communities in Trousdale County, Tennessee
Unincorporated communities in Tennessee